Baroness Franziska "Fanny" von Arnstein (29 September 1758 – 8 June 1818), born Vögele Itzig, was a Viennese socialite and salonnière.

Biography
Fanny Arnstein was born in Berlin, the daughter of Daniel Itzig. She was a member of the extensive and influential Jewish Itzig family.

She married the banker Nathan Adam von Arnstein, a partner in the firm of Arnstein and Eskeles; her sister Caecilie (Zipperche) was married to the other partner, Bernhard von Eskeles. They brought the social influences of Berlin to Vienna, notably the concept of the intellectual salon, to the Vienna of Joseph II.  The Arnstein mansion at Vienna and her villas at Schönbrunn and Baden bei Wien were regularly used for hospitality.  She was also involved in charitable works.

During the Vienna Congress the Arnstein salon was frequented by celebrities including Wellington, Talleyrand, Hardenberg, Rahel Varnhagen and her husband, the Schlegels, Justinus Kerner, Karoline Pichler, and Zacharias Werner.  She was one of the founders of the Gesellschaft der Musikfreunde and was herself a skilled musician.

In 1814, Fanny von Arnstein introduced a new custom from Berlin, hitherto unknown in Vienna: the Christmas tree.

Her only daughter, Henrietta, Baroness Pereira-Arnstein, was also a skilled musician and a regular correspondent of her cousin, Lea Salomon, wife of Abraham Mendelssohn and mother of Felix and Fanny Mendelssohn (who was named after Fanny Arnstein).

See also
 Benedikt Arnstein
 Bernhard von Eskeles
 Itzig family
 Palais Arnstein
 Salon of Berta Zuckerkandl

References

Bibliography
 Varnhagen von Ense, Ausgewählte Schriften, xvii. 328-335;
 Encyclopaedia Judaica

External links
 

1758 births
1818 deaths
18th-century Austrian Jews
19th-century Austrian people
Austrian baronesses
Austrian people of German descent
Nobility from Vienna
People from Berlin
Austrian salon-holders